The Hermitage, also known as Devereaux House, is a historic home located at Virginia Beach, Virginia.  The original section was built about 1700, with two later additions.  It is a -story, four bay, Colonial era frame dwelling.  The second portion was constructed by about 1820, doubling the size of the dwelling, and the final portion was added in 1940.  Also on the property are three outbuildings, as well as a large subterranean brick cistern, now part of the basement to the house.

It was added to the National Register of Historic Places in 2008.

References

Houses on the National Register of Historic Places in Virginia
Colonial architecture in Virginia
Houses completed in 1700
Houses in Virginia Beach, Virginia
National Register of Historic Places in Virginia Beach, Virginia
1700 establishments in Virginia